It's the Holiday Season is the fourteenth studio album and second Christmas album by Martina McBride. It was released on October 19, 2018.

Commercial performance
The album debuted at No. 8 on the Billboard Holiday Albums chart, with 1,400 copies sold in the first week.  It has sold 15,100 copies in the United States as of January 2019.

This was the last recording composer Patrick Williams contributed prior to his death. The album is dedicated in memory to him.

Track listing

Personnel 
Vocals and Rhythm Section
 Martina McBride – lead vocals 
 Tom Ranier – grand piano 
 Graham Dechter – guitars 
 Chuck Berghofer – bass 
 Peter Erskine – drums 
 Daniel Greco – percussion 
 Mark Ivey – backing vocals 
 Marabeth Quil – backing vocals 
 Kira Small – backing vocals 
 Bergen White – backing vocals, vocal arrangements 

Orchestra
 Patrick Williams – arrangements and conductor 
 Elliot Deutsch – additional arrangements (6)
 Joe Soldo – contractor 
 Ralph Morrison – concertmaster 
 Gordon Berger, Bill Edwards, J.B. Griffiths, Daniel Perito and Terry Woodson – music copyists
Horns
 Dan Higgins and Don Shelton – alto saxophone 
 Gene Cipriano – baritone saxophone 
 Jeff Driskill and Bob Sheppard – tenor saxophone 
 Ben Devitt – bass trombone 
 Charles Loper, Bob McChesney and Charlie Morillas – trombone
 Wayne Bergeron, Chuck Findley, Rob Schaer and Michael Stever – trumpet 
Strings
 Timothy Loo, Christina Soule and John Walz – cello 
 Amy Wilkins – harp
 Andrew Duckles, Matt Funes and Carolyn Riley – viola
 Darius Campo, Neel Hammond, Carrie Kennedy, Johana Krejci, Joel Pargman, Alyssa Park, Radu Pieptea, Neil Samples, Mary Sloan, Jenny Takamatsu and Ina Veli – violin

Production 
 Martina McBride – producer 
 Al Schmitt – recording, mixing 
 Steve Genewick – recording assistant 
 Chandler Harrod – mix assistant 
 Allen Ditto – vocal recording 
 John McBride – additional mixing 
 Jory Roberts – additional mix assistant 
 Chris Small – digital editing 
 Ryan Smith – mastering at Sterling Sound (New York City, New York)
 Glenn Sweitzer – package design 
 Joseph Llanes – photography 
 Courtney Kivela Robinson – wardrobe stylist 
 Lindsay Doyle – hair, make-up

References

External links

2018 Christmas albums
Martina McBride albums
BBR Music Group albums
Christmas albums by American artists
Country Christmas albums